KCDH-LP, channel 4, was a FamilyNet affiliate analog television station located in Winnfield, Louisiana.  Its analog transmitter was located south of Winnfield. It was also offered on Suddenlink.

Carried local police jury, city council and school board meetings as well as local parades and football games.

The station's license was cancelled by the Federal Communications Commission on July 25, 2012.

External links

Religious television stations in the United States

Television channels and stations established in 1995
Defunct television stations in the United States
Television channels and stations disestablished in 2012
1995 establishments in Louisiana
2012 disestablishments in Louisiana
Defunct mass media in Louisiana